Zdihovo may refer to:

 Zdihovo, Kočevje, an abandoned settlement near Kočevje, Slovenia
 Zdihovo, Zagreb County, a village near Jastrebarsko, Croatia
 Zdihovo, Primorje-Gorski Kotar County, a village near Vrbovsko, Croatia